Xavier Catholic College, Llandilo is an independent Roman Catholic co-educational secondary day school, located in Llandilo, a western suburb of Sydney, New South Wales, Australia.

Location 
The college campus was previously located behind Corpus Christi Primary School, Cranebrook and was then constructed at its current location on Ninth Ave, Llandilo.

Campus 
The current Xavier Campus consists of eight main classroom blocks, including a Kirinari block for special education provision. Each building houses a separate faculty's subjects including:
A: Administration 
B: Technology & Applied Studies 
C: English General Learning 
D: Xavier Centre and Computer Science 
E: Performing Arts 
F: Science 
G: Creative Arts 
H: HSIE & Mathematics 
M: Religious Education (Mary MacKillop Centre) 
Z: Personal Development, Health, and Physical Education (Demountable Area)

Houses 
Xavier Catholic College, Llandilo has a prestigious history, some of which has been captured some in the names of the college houses:
McCormack (Orange) - Saint Irene McCormack. 
MacKillop (Yellow) - Blessed Mary MacKillop (1842–1909) was beatified in 1996 by Pope John Paul II. Canonised in 2010
Loyola (Purple) - Saint Ignatius Loyola
Campion (Blue) 
Tenison (Green)
Faber (White)

See also

 List of Catholic schools in New South Wales
 Catholic education in Australia

References 

Catholic secondary schools in Sydney
2006 establishments in Australia
Educational institutions established in 2006
Roman Catholic Diocese of Parramatta